Belted, Buckled And Booted is a Faster Pussycat EP.

Track listing
"Nonstop to Nowhere" - 6:37
"Too Tight" - 	5:04
"Charge Me Up" - 4:10
"You're So Vain" (Carly Simon cover) - 4:08

Track 1 from the Whipped! album. Tracks 2 and 3 are unreleased tracks from the Whipped! sessions. Track 4 was originally released in 1990 on Rubáiyát: Elektra's 40th Anniversary.

Personnel
 Taime Downe: lead vocals
 Greg Steele: guitar
 Brent Muscat: guitar
 Eric Stacy: bass guitar
 Brett Bradshaw: drums

Faster Pussycat albums
1992 EPs